Waller is a surname mainly of Old English origin, with several possible etymologies. Notable people with this name include:

Arts and entertainment

Music
Charlie Waller (American musician) (1935–2004), American bluegrass musician
Charlie Waller (British musician) (born 1980), British rock musician
Fats Waller, jazz musician
Gordon Waller (1945–2009), Scottish singer-songwriter and guitarist, one half of the duo Peter and Gordon
Rik Waller, British singer

Other media
Anthony Waller (born 1959), film director 
Carroll Waller (1927–2014), American preservationist and writer
Douglas C. Waller (born 1949), American writer
Edmund Waller (1606–1687), English poet and politician
Emma Waller (1815–1899), English actress, famous in America
Farida Waller (born 1993), Thai actress and model
Fred Waller, (1886–1954), inventor of Cinerama
Judith C. Waller (1889–1973), American radio pioneer
Lewis Waller (1860–1915), English actor
Mary Lemon Waller (1851–1931), English portrait painter
Robert James Waller (1939–2017), American author
Tom Waller (born 1974), Thai film director and producer
Vincent Waller, American animator, showrunner of SpongeBob SquarePants since 2015

Government and politics
Benjamin Waller, Williamsburg, Virginia attorney and judge
Bill Waller, American politician, governor of Mississippi
Christopher Waller, American economist 
Edwin Waller, American statesman
Gary Waller (1945–2017), British politician
George Mark Waller, Lord Justice of Appeal, Court of Appeal of England and Wales
George Platt Waller, American diplomat
John L. Waller, lawyer, journalist, publisher and U.S. Counsel to Madagascar
Keith Waller (1914–1992), Australian public servant and diplomat
Mark Waller (judge), British judge
Robert Waller (pundit), British elections expert
William L. Waller, Jr., American chief justice of the Mississippi Supreme Court

Military
Hardress Waller (c. 1604–1666), English parliamentarian in the English Civil War, convicted of the regicide of King Charles I
Hector Waller, officer in the Royal Australian Navy
Littleton Waller, officer in the United States Marine Corps
William Waller (c. 1597–1668), English Parliamentary general during the English Civil War
William Francis Frederick Waller (1839–1885), British soldier and a recipient of the Victoria Cross
Sir Richard Waller (c. 1395–c. 1462), English soldier and official noted for capturing the Duke of Orleans, the French commander at the Battle of Agincourt

Religion
Charles Henry Waller (1840–1910), Church of England theologian
J. G. Waller, Canadian Anglican missionary in Japan
John Waller (preacher) (1741–1802), Baptist preacher in Virginia, South Carolina and Kentucky

Science and academia
Alfred Rayney Waller (1867–1922), British journalist, translator and editor
Augustus Volney Waller (1816–1870), British neurophysiologist
Augustus Desiré Waller (1856–1922), scientist and son of Augustus Volney Waller
Carroll Waller (1927–2014), American preservationist and writer
Erik Waller (collector) (1875–1955), Swedish surgeon and book collector
Ivar Waller (1898–1991), physicist

Sports
Alex Waller (born 1990), English rugby union player
Charlie Waller (American football) (1921–2009), American football coach
Chris Waller (gymnast) (born 1968), American gymnast
Chris Waller (cricketer) (born 1948), English cricketer
Darren Waller (born 1992), American football player
Dwight Waller, American professional basketball player
Erik Waller (sailor) (1887–1958), Swedish sailor who competed in the 1912 Summer Olympics
Ethan Waller (born 1992), English rugby union player
Phil Waller (rugby union), Wales and British Lions rugby player
Ruth Waller, English athlete
Tye Waller (born 1957), American baseball player
Wilf Waller (born 1877), South African footballer with Bolton Wanderers, Tottenham Hotspur and Southampton

Other fields
Waller family (Kent)
Anne Waller, Lady Waller (died 1661 or 1662), English diarist
Frederick S. Waller (1822-1905), resident architect of Gloucester Cathedral
Mathew Waller (1617–1680), Early New England settler

Fictional
Amanda Waller, DC Comics character
Toby Waller, character of Roots known as Kunta Kinte

References

See also
Justice Waller (disambiguation)